Nipponaphaenops erraticus is a species of beetle in the family Carabidae, the only species in the genus Nipponaphaenops.

References

Trechinae